Egg garnish, called al-gomyeong in Korean, is a common topping in Korean cuisine, made with egg whites and egg yolks. Egg yolks and egg whites are separated, beaten without creating foam, pan-fried with little oil into thin sheets without browning, then cut into thin strips, diamonds, or rectangles. The white and yellow egg sheets before being cut are called jidan.

Gallery

See also 
 Fios de ovos

References 

Food and drink decorations
Korean cuisine